Samata Samaj Party, was a political party in India. SSP was formed by expelled Bahujan Samaj Party leader Phool Singh Baraiyya (formerly BSP Madhya Pradesh state president) on October 30, 2003. Baraiyya became the party president and Sant Kumar (also expelled from BSP) vice-president.

The Punjab state president of SSP was Darshan Singh Jethumajara.

On July 7, 2004 SSP merged into Lok Janshakti Party.

Also See
 Samata Party led by Uday Mandal its President

References 

Defunct political parties in India
Political parties established in 2003
2003 establishments in India
Political parties disestablished in 2004
2004 disestablishments in India
Lok Janshakti Party